Yolonda Ross is an American actress, writer and director.

Life and career
Ross was born and raised in Omaha, Nebraska. She began her acting career in New York, appearing in the episodes of television series New York Undercover and Third Watch. Before landing the leading role in the independent drama film, Stranger Inside (2001). The movie produced by HBO, first premiered on television, but Ross was nominated for an Independent Spirit Award for Best Debut Performance. She later had supporting roles in a number of independent productions and guest-starred on Law & Order and Law & Order: Criminal Intent, and in 2011 had a recurring role of HBO's Treme.

Ross co-starred alongside LisaGay Hamilton in the critically acclaimed 2013 independent drama film, Go for Sisters. She received Independent Spirit Award for Best Supporting Female nomination for her performance in film. She later was cast opposite Viola Davis in Lila & Eve. In 2015, Ross played Robyn Crawford, the friend, assistant, and reported girlfriend of Whitney Houston, in the Lifetime movie, Whitney directed by Angela Bassett.

In 2017, Ross had a recurring role opposite Viola Davis in the ABC legal thriller How to Get Away with Murder. The following year she was cast in a series regular role in the Showtime drama series, The Chi.

Filmography

Film and TV Movies

Television

Awards and nominations

References

External links

Year of birth missing (living people)
American film actresses
American television actresses
Living people
20th-century American actresses
21st-century American actresses
Actresses from Omaha, Nebraska
African-American actresses
20th-century African-American women
20th-century African-American people
21st-century African-American women
21st-century African-American people